Julie Joosten (born 1980) is an American-Canadian poet. Her debut collection, Light Light, was a nominee for the Governor General's Award for English-language poetry at the 2014 Governor General's Awards, the 2014 Gerald Lampert Award and the 2014 Goldie Award from the Golden Crown Literary Society.

Originally from Marietta, Georgia, she is a graduate of Williams College, Oxford University, the University of Iowa Writers' Workshop and Cornell University. She is currently based in Toronto, Ontario.

References

1980 births
Living people
American women poets
21st-century American poets
Canadian women poets
21st-century Canadian poets
Writers from Toronto
People from Marietta, Georgia
Writers from Georgia (U.S. state)
American expatriate writers in Canada
Cornell University alumni
Iowa Writers' Workshop alumni
Williams College alumni
21st-century Canadian women writers
21st-century American women writers